Rock 'n' Roll is the sixth studio album by English musician John Lennon. Released in February 1975, it is an album of late 1950s and early 1960s songs as covered by Lennon. Recording the album was problematic and spanned an entire year: Phil Spector produced sessions in October 1973 at A&M Studios, and Lennon produced sessions in October 1974 at the Record Plant (East). Lennon was being sued by Morris Levy over copyright infringement of one line in his song "Come Together". As part of an agreement, Lennon had to include three Levy-owned songs on Rock 'n' Roll. Spector disappeared with the session recordings and was subsequently involved in a motor accident, leaving the album's tracks unrecoverable until the beginning of the Walls and Bridges sessions. With Walls and Bridges coming out first, featuring one Levy-owned song, Levy sued Lennon expecting to see Lennon's Rock 'n' Roll album.

The album reached number 6 in both the United Kingdom and the United States, later being certified gold in both countries. It was supported by the single "Stand by Me", which peaked at number 20 in the US, and 30 in the UK. The cover photo was taken by Jürgen Vollmer during the Beatles' stay in Hamburg. It was to be Lennon's last solo album; with no recording contract obligation, he was on hiatus from the music business to raise his son Sean. Lennon and his wife Yoko Ono staged a comeback with their joint release Double Fantasy in 1980.

Background
In 1969, Lennon composed the song "Come Together" for the Beatles' album Abbey Road.  Inspired by the Chuck Berry tune "You Can't Catch Me", it bore a melodic resemblance to the original—and Lennon took the third line of the second verse ("Here come [old] flat-top") for the new lyric. Publisher Morris Levy brought a lawsuit for infringement, and the case was due to be heard in a New York court in December 1973. It was later settled out of court, with the agreement that, according to an announcement by Levy, Lennon had to "record three songs by Big Seven publishers on his next album". The songs [he] intends to record at this time are "You Can't Catch Me", "Angel Baby" and "Ya Ya"." Lennon had the right to change the last two songs to any other songs that were published by Big Seven. In the meantime, Lennon had split with Yoko Ono and was living in Los Angeles with his personal assistant, May Pang. Nostalgia was a popular trend on film with American Graffiti, and television was readying the series Happy Days (Lennon and Pang had even visited the set). Lennon, rather than writing his own songs, and partly inspired by his arrangement to include at least three songs from Levy's publishing company catalogue, Big Seven Music, decided to record an album of oldies as his next release, following Mind Games.

Recording
Lennon initially teamed up with producer Phil Spector to record the album, letting Spector have full control. Spector chose some of the songs, booked the studio, and the musicians. When news got around that Lennon was in Hollywood making a record, every musician there wanted to be part of the sessions. In mid-October 1973, sessions were booked at A&M Studios, with many of them having over 30 musicians, but the sessions quickly fell into disarray—fueled by alcohol. Spector once showed up dressed in a surgeon's outfit and shot a gun in the ceiling of the studio, hurting Lennon's ears. On another occasion, a bottle of whiskey had spilled on the A&M Studio's mixing console causing future sessions to be banned from the facility. Unknown to Lennon, each night Spector would remove the master tapes from the studio, and move them to his house. Spector then disappeared with the session tapes and would not be heard from for several months. Spector made one cryptic call to Lennon, claiming to have the "John Dean tapes" from the recent Watergate scandal; Lennon deduced that Spector meant he had the album's master tapes. When a car accident on 31 March 1974 left Spector in a coma, the project was put on indefinite hold. In mid-1974, Lennon returned to New York with Pang and began writing and recording a new album of original material, Walls and Bridges. Shortly before these sessions began, Al Coury, then-head of A&R/promotion for Capitol Records retrieved the Spector tapes. Not wanting to break stride, Lennon shelved the tapes and completed work on Walls and Bridges.

With Walls and Bridges coming out first, Lennon had reneged on his deal with Levy, and Levy threatened to refile his lawsuit, but Lennon explained to Levy what had happened, and assured him that the covers album was indeed in the works. Levy gave Lennon use of his farm in upstate New York to rehearse material. Lennon then recalled the session musicians from Walls and Bridges to complete the oldies tracks. Several tracks never made it past the rehearsal stage: "C'mon Everybody", "Thirty Days", "That'll Be the Day" – the band also played a few impromptu jams. On 21 October, Lennon went into Record Plant East, completing the oldies tracks in a few days. Lennon wanted the musicians to stay close to the original arrangements of the songs, apart from "Do You Wanna Dance?". Mixing and editing lasted until mid-November. To assure him progress was being made, Lennon gave Levy a rough tape of the sessions to review. Levy took the tapes and pressed his own version of the album called Roots: John Lennon Sings the Great Rock & Roll Hits on his record label, Adam VIII, then proceeded to sue Lennon, EMI and Capitol for $42 million for breach of contract. Capitol/EMI quickly sought an injunction. After two trials, in which Lennon had to convince the court of the difference between a rough version and a final take, Levy won $6,795 in damages, and Lennon won $144,700, in February 1976. The album was originally scheduled for release in April 1975; however, in February 1975, Capitol Records rush-released the official Rock 'n' Roll as a Capitol "budget" album (prefix code SK—one dollar cheaper than the usual releases) to counteract sales of the Levy album.

Reception and aftermath

Although some critics derided the album as "a step backward", The Rolling Stone Album Guide wrote that "John lends dignity to these classics; his singing is tender, convincing, and fond." AllMusic described the album "as a peak in [Lennon's] post-Imagine catalog: an album that catches him with nothing to prove and no need to try".

The album was released on 17 February 1975 in the US, and a few days later in the UK, on 21 February 1975. It reached number 6 in both the United Kingdom and the United States. On 10 March and 18 April 1975, in the US and UK respectively, "Stand by Me" was released as a single, backed with "Move Over Ms. L", a song that was meant to appear on Walls and Bridges but cut from the final line-up. It peaked at number 20 in the US and number 30 in the UK. Lennon promoted the song by appearing on the BBC TV show Old Grey Whistle Test, which also featured an interview by Bob Harris. The show had Lennon singing live over the backing tracks of "Stand by Me" and "Slippin' and Slidin'". Lennon also appeared on Salute to Sir Lew – The Master Showman singing live again over backing tracks, this time for three songs: "Stand by Me", "Slippin' and Slidin'" and "Imagine". A second single, "Slippin N Slidin"/"Ain't That a Shame" (Apple 1883), was announced, promotional copies were pressed, but was never released. "Ya Ya", backed with "Be-Bop-A-Lula", was released as a single only in Germany, peaking at number 47 on the Media Control Charts. Lennon said the following about Rock 'n' Roll: "It started in '73 with Phil and fell apart. I ended up as part of mad, drunk scenes in Los Angeles and I finally finished it off on my own. And there was still problems with it up to the minute it came out. I can't begin to say, it's just barmy, there's a jinx on that album."

Not long after the album appeared, Lennon reconciled with Ono, and she soon became pregnant. Determined not to lose another baby after three consecutive miscarriages, Lennon decided to halt his musical career for his family. Sean Lennon was born that October (on his father's 35th birthday); following the release of the compilation Shaved Fish, Lennon would not return with a new release until 1980. "Stand by Me" was reissued in the US, with "Woman Is the Nigger of the World", on 4 April 1977. The album re-charted in the UK on 17 January 1981, at number 64. In the US, it was reissued in October 1980, also at budget price, and it was briefly reissued in the UK by the budget label Music for Pleasure with an alternative cover on 25 November 1981. After Lennon's death, the album, along with seven other Lennon albums, was reissued by EMI as part of a box set, which was released in the UK on 15 June 1981. In 1981, Belgium and France issued the album, along with the Beatles' Rock 'n' Roll Music, as part of a box set. The album was first issued on CD on 26 May 1987. In 1988 it was reissued in Australia with an alternative cover and under the title Rip It Up. In 2004, Yoko Ono supervised the remixing of Rock 'n' Roll for its reissue, including four bonus tracks from the ill-fated Spector sessions. These leftovers from the sessions had already appeared, as part of 1986's Menlove Ave. (a collection of outtakes) or the John Lennon Anthology box set. (The Lennon/Spector co-composition "Here We Go Again" was not included on the remastered Rock 'n' Roll, and can be found on Menlove Ave. as well as the soundtrack album for The U.S. vs. John Lennon and the 2010 Gimme Some Truth 4-CD set under the 4th CD entitled "Roots" featuring the Rock 'n' Roll tracks). In 2010, the original album mixes were remastered, the album was available separately or as part of the John Lennon Signature Box.

Cover art

Lennon planned to use some of his childhood drawings for the cover of his oldies album, and production had already begun when Lennon switched gears, so the artwork was used instead for Walls and Bridges. In September 1974, May Pang attended the first Beatlefest convention at Lennon's behest, and met Jürgen Vollmer, an old friend of the Beatles from Hamburg, Germany, who had photographed the band from their Hamburg days.  He was selling some striking portraits, and Pang immediately phoned Lennon to tell him of her find.  Reuniting with Vollmer in New York, Lennon chose one of his photos for the album's cover.

The photo depicts Lennon in a doorway with three blurry figures walking past him in the foreground. Those figures are George Harrison, Stu Sutcliffe and Paul McCartney. It was taken on 22 Wohlwill Street in Hamburg. The album's working title had been Oldies But Mouldies; no official title had been chosen until Lennon saw the neon sign prepared as cover art by John Uomoto, with Lennon's name and the words "ROCK 'N' ROLL" beneath. This struck Lennon in a positive way, and it became the album title.

Track listing
All tracks produced and arranged by John Lennon, except * produced by Phil Spector, and arranged by Spector and Lennon.

2004 reissue bonus tracks

Personnel

John Lennon – guitar, vocals
Jesse Ed Davis – guitar
Jim Calvert – guitar
Steve Cropper – guitar
Louie Shelton – guitar
Eddie Mottau – acoustic guitar
José Feliciano – acoustic guitar
Michael Hazelwood – acoustic guitar
Klaus Voormann – bass guitar, answer vocal on "Bring It On Home to Me"
Leon Russell – keyboards
Ken Ascher – keyboards
Michael Lang – keyboards
Jim Keltner – drums
Hal Blaine – drums
Gary Mallaber – drums
Arthur Jenkins – percussion
Nino Tempo – saxophone
Jeff Barry – horn
Barry Mann – horn
Bobby Keys – horn
Peter Jameson – horn
Joseph Temperley – horn
Dennis Morouse – horn
Frank Vicari – horn

Charts

Weekly charts

Weekly charts (reissue)

Year-end charts

Certifications

See also
Pussy Cats

References
 Footnotes

 Citations

External links

Lennon v. Levy – The Roots Lawsuit
The Roots of Rock 'n' Roll

John Lennon albums
1975 albums
Rockabilly albums
Apple Records albums
Albums produced by Phil Spector
Covers albums
Albums arranged by John Lennon
Albums arranged by Phil Spector
Albums produced by John Lennon
Albums recorded at A&M Studios
Albums recorded at Record Plant (New York City)
British rock-and-roll albums